= Olena Kozharko =

Ukrainian beauty pageant winner

- Born: Kyiv, Ukraine
- Height: 175 cm (5 ft 9 in)
- Beauty pageant titleholder
- Hair color: Light brown
- Eye color: Hazel

Olena Kozharko (Ukrainian: Олена Кожарко) was crowned Miss Harley-Davidson 2014 and was featured on the pages of Playboy as a part of the award.
